Yosht is a village in Baqeran Rural District, in the Central District of Birjand County, South Khorasan Province, Iran. At the 2006 census, its existence was noted, but its population was not reported.

References 

Populated places in Birjand County